Tebandeke Mujambula, sometimes spelled as Ttebandeke Mujambula, was Kabaka of the Kingdom of Buganda between 1704 and 1724. He was the eighteenth (18th) Kabaka of Buganda.

Claim to the throne

He was the second son of Kabaka Mutebi I, Kabaka of Buganda, who reigned between 1674 and 1680. His mother was Nabukalu of the Lugave clan, the second (2nd) of his father's five (5) wives. He ascended to the throne after the death of his uncle, around 1704. He established his capital at Bundeke.

During his reign, Tebandeke's children were faced with a severe illness and he sent for oracles to establish the cause of the malady. The oracles prescribed a ritual, which the Kabaka performed and the children survived. For this, the oracles demanded a high price for their services and shamed Tebandeke with public demands for their payment. The mortified Kabaka had the oracles put to death and their temples burned down. The Kabaka however was driven mad and ran into the forest.

Married life
He married five (5) wives:

 Naabakyaala  Nakyaazirana, Kaddulubaale, daughter of Sensalire, of the Njovu clan
 Balangazza, daughter of Sekayiba, of the Mbogo clan
 Nabali, daughter of Sempala, of the Ffumbe clan
 Nabaziika, sister of Nakuwanda, and daughter of Mugema, of the Nkima clan
 Nakuwande, sister of Nabazika, and daughter of Mugema, of the Nkima clan

Issue
He is recorded to have fathered only one child:

 Prince (Omulangira) Juma Katebe, whose mother was Nakyaazirana. He was excluded from the succession by Kabaka Ndawula Nsobya.

The final years
Kabaka Tebandeke died at the Kanyakasasa Palace, Bundeke. He was buried at Bundeke.

Succession table

See also
 Kabaka of Buganda

References

External links
List of the Kings of Buganda

Kabakas of Buganda
18th-century monarchs in Africa